Fresno Adult School, formerly Fresno Tech, is a public school located at the Cesar E. Chavez Adult Education Center operated by the Fresno Unified School District (FUSD) in Fresno, California.  The school was constructed on the site of the first public junior college in California.

References

External links
 Fresno Adult School official website

Education in Fresno, California